Theodore Luckenbill (July 27, 1939 – June 24, 2012) was an American professional basketball player. He spent two seasons (1961–1963) in the National Basketball Association (NBA).

A 6'6" forward who attended Elkhart High School and the University of Houston, Luckenbill was selected by the Philadelphia Warriors in the 1961 NBA draft. Luckenbill died in Dallas, Texas on June 24, 2012 at age 72 from cancer.

References

External links 
 Career NBA stats @ basketball-reference.com
 Career NCAA stats @ thedraftreview.com

1939 births
2012 deaths
American men's basketball players
Basketball players from Indiana
Deaths from cancer in Texas
Houston Cougars men's basketball players
People from Elkhart, Indiana
Philadelphia Warriors draft picks
Philadelphia Warriors players
San Francisco Warriors players
Small forwards
Wilkes-Barre Barons players